NFL Countdown may refer to the following ESPN pregame shows that cover the National Football League:
 Sunday NFL Countdown
 Monday Night Countdown